Leon Hirszman (22 November 1937 – 15 September 1987) was a Brazilian film director, producer and screenwriter, and one of the main figures of Cinema Novo. He is best known for directing the 1981 film They Don't Wear Black Tie which won the Special Jury Prize at the 38th Venice International Film Festival. His other films include Fernanda Montenegro's 1965 film debut The Deceased, the 1972 adaptation of Graciliano Ramos's S. Bernardo and the documentary ABC da Greve. He died from complications of HIV/AIDS at 49.

Filmography

References

External links 

1937 births
1987 deaths
Brazilian film directors
Brazilian people of Polish-Jewish descent
People from Rio de Janeiro (city)
AIDS-related deaths in Rio de Janeiro (state)